Juan Manuel Suárez Del Toro Rivero, from Spain, is the current President of the Spanish Red Cross and is a former president of the International Federation of Red Cross and Red Crescent Societies.

References 

Living people
Presidents of the International Federation of Red Cross and Red Crescent Societies
Year of birth missing (living people)